The Lorain Correctional Institution is a state prison in Grafton, Ohio, United States. It is run by the Ohio Department of Rehabilitation and Correction as a reception & distribution center for the northern half of the state.  It stands adjacent and to the north of Ohio's Grafton Correctional Institution.

As of August 2013 Lorain was called one of the state's most overcrowded prisons.  In a facility designed for 1089 prisoners, Lorain housed 1473 and stood at 135% capacity, reflecting overcrowded conditions in all of Ohio's state prisons.

References 

Prisons in Ohio
Buildings and structures in Lorain County, Ohio
1990 establishments in Ohio